The 1996 Montreal Expos season was the 28th season in franchise history. An 88-74 finish was good enough to put them in 2nd in the NL East, 8 games behind the National League Champion Atlanta Braves and 2 games behind the Los Angeles Dodgers in the Wild Card standings.

Offseason
October 13, 1995: Butch Henry was selected off waivers by the Boston Red Sox from the Montreal Expos.
December 1, 1995: Wally Whitehurst was signed as a free agent with the Montreal Expos. 
December 4, 1995: Jalal Leach was drafted by the Montreal Expos from the New York Yankees in the 1995 minor league draft.
December 15, 1995: Omar Daal was traded by the Los Angeles Dodgers to the Montreal Expos for Rick Clelland (minors). 
December 20, 1995: Andy Stankiewicz signed as a free agent with the Montreal Expos.
March 13, 1996: Rick Schu was signed as a free agent with the Montreal Expos. 
March 13, 1996: Sherman Obando was traded by the Baltimore Orioles to the Montreal Expos for Tony Tarasco.

Spring training
The Expos held spring training at West Palm Beach Municipal Stadium in West Palm Beach, Florida – a facility they shared with the Atlanta Braves. It was their 20th season at the stadium; they had conducted spring training there from 1969 to 1972 and since 1981.

Regular season
Opening Day (April 1) – Seven pitches into the first game of the season, at Riverfront Stadium in Cincinnati, home plate umpire John McSherry collapses on the field and dies of a massive heart attack. The game between the Cincinnati Reds and the Expos is postponed, along with the rest of the games scheduled for that day. Reds owner Marge Schott later comes under fire for wanting the game in Cincinnati to continue despite the tragedy (and against the wishes of the players on both teams), saying that she felt "cheated" when it was canceled.

The Expos set an MLB record with six grand slams before May 1, a feat not equaled until the 2018 Boston Red Sox.

Ultimately, the Expos finished two games behind the Los Angeles Dodgers in the National League wild card race.

Opening Day lineup

April 1 (game postponed)
 Mark Grudzielanek
 Mike Lansing
 Rondell White
  
  
  
  
  
 Pedro Martínez, P
Source:

April 2
 Mark Grudzielanek, SS
 Mike Lansing, 2B
 Rondell White, CF
 Moises Alou, LF
 David Segui, 1B
 Sherman Obando, RF
 Darrin Fletcher, C
 Shane Andrews, 3B
 Jeff Fassero, P
Source:

Note: sources do not list the complete Expos lineup for April 1, although it was likely the same (other than the pitcher) as for April 2, as the Reds use the same starting pitcher, left-hander Pete Schourek, on both days.

Season standings

Record vs. opponents

Game log

|- bgcolor="ffbbbb"
| 1 || April 2 || @ Reds || 1–4 || Schourek || Fassero (0–1) || Moore || 53,136 || 0–1
|- bgcolor="ccffcc"
| 2 || April 3 || @ Reds || 8–4 || Veres (1–0) || Shaw || — || 19,104 || 1–1
|- bgcolor="ccffcc"
| 3 || April 4 || @ Reds || 10–2 || Paniagua (1–0) || Burba || — || 17,067 || 2–1
|- bgcolor="ccffcc"
| 4 || April 5 || Rockies || 6–4 || Dyer (1–0) || Munoz || Rojas (1) || 45,042 || 3–1
|- bgcolor="ffbbbb"
| 5 || April 6 || Rockies || 4–5 || Thompson || Rueter (0–1) || Leskanic || 27,040 || 3–2
|- bgcolor="ccffcc"
| 6 || April 7 || Rockies || 9–1 || Fassero (1–1) || Painter || — || 11,212 || 4–2
|- bgcolor="ccffcc"
| 7 || April 8 || @ Cardinals || 4–3 (10) || Rojas (1–0) || Parrett || — || 52,841 || 5–2
|- bgcolor="ffbbbb"
| 8 || April 10 || @ Cardinals || 1–4 || Benes || Paniagua (1–1) || — || 27,734 || 5–3
|- bgcolor="ccffcc"
| 9 || April 11 || @ Pirates || 6–5 (11) || Rojas (2–0) || Cordova || Veres (1) || 8,084 || 6–3
|- bgcolor="ccffcc"
| 10 || April 12 || @ Pirates || 13–3 || Rueter (1–1) || Darwin || — || 13,087 || 7–3
|- bgcolor="ffbbbb"
| 11 || April 13 || @ Pirates || 3–9 || Wagner || Fassero (1–2) || — || 13,834 || 7–4
|- bgcolor="ffbbbb"
| 12 || April 14 || @ Pirates || 2–5 || Neagle || Martinez (0–1) || — || 12,797 || 7–5
|- bgcolor="ccffcc"
| 13 || April 16 || Phillies || 7–6 || Rojas (3–0) || Springer || — || 8,510 || 8–5
|- bgcolor="ffbbbb"
| 14 || April 17 || Phillies || 3–9 || Mulholland || Cormier (0–1) || — || 8,728 || 8–6
|- bgcolor="ffbbbb"
| 15 || April 18 || Phillies || 8–9 || Bottalico || Rojas (3–1) || — || 8,316 || 8–7
|- bgcolor="ccffcc"
| 16 || April 19 || Pirates || 2–1 || Manuel (1–0) || Plesac || — || 13,256 || 9–7
|- bgcolor="ccffcc"
| 17 || April 20 || Pirates || 11–2 || Martinez (1–1) || Ericks || — || 14,022 || 10–7
|- bgcolor="ccffcc"
| 18 || April 21 || Pirates || 9–4 || Veres (2–0) || Christiansen || — || 11,361 || 11–7
|- bgcolor="ccffcc"
| 19 || April 22 || Cardinals || 8–0 || Cormier (1–1) || Osborne || — || 9,778 || 12–7
|- bgcolor="ccffcc"
| 20 || April 23 || Cardinals || 12–11 || Scott (1–0) || Mathews || — || 8,352 || 13–7
|- bgcolor="ccffcc"
| 21 || April 24 || Reds || 7–6 (10) || Dyer (2–0) || Moore || — || 10,126 || 14–7
|- bgcolor="ccffcc"
| 22 || April 25 || Reds || 8–4 || Martinez (2–1) || Smiley || — || 13,067 || 15–7
|- bgcolor="ccffcc"
| 23 || April 26 || @ Rockies || 6–2 || Alvarez (1–0) || Reynoso || — || 48,024 || 16–7
|- bgcolor="ffbbbb"
| 24 || April 27 || @ Rockies || 5–6 (13) || Painter || Daal (0–1) || — || 48,013 || 16–8
|- bgcolor="ccffcc"
| 25 || April 28 || @ Rockies || 21–9 || Rueter (2–1) || Rekar || — || 48,006 || 17–8
|- bgcolor="ffbbbb"
| 26 || April 29 || @ Mets || 2–3 || Harnisch || Fassero (1–3) || Franco || 14,011 || 17–9
|-

|- bgcolor="ccffcc"
| 27 || May 1 || @ Mets || 4–0 || Martinez (3–1) || Clark || — || — || 18–9
|- bgcolor="ffbbbb"
| 28 || May 1 || @ Mets || 0–6 || Isringhausen || Alvarez (1–1) || — || 16,937 || 18–10
|- bgcolor="ffbbbb"
| 29 || May 3 || @ Astros || 1–4 || Reynolds || Cormier (1–2) || Jones || 19,633 || 18–11
|- bgcolor="ccffcc"
| 30 || May 4 || @ Astros || 2–1 || Veres (3–0) || Hernandez || Rojas (2) || 22,810 || 19–11
|- bgcolor="ccffcc"
| 31 || May 5 || @ Astros || 5–0 || Fassero (2–3) || Brocail || — || 25,207 || 20–11
|- bgcolor="ccffcc"
| 32 || May 6 || Cubs || 6–2 || Martinez (4–1) || Bullinger || — || 46,893 || 21–11
|- bgcolor="ccffcc"
| 33 || May 7 || Cubs || 8–3 || Veres (4–0) || Adams || — || 13,236 || 22–11
|- bgcolor="ccffcc"
| 34 || May 8 || Cubs || 4–2 || Cormier (2–2) || Navarro || Rojas (3) || 12,484 || 23–11
|- bgcolor="ffbbbb"
| 35 || May 9 || Astros || 4–11 || Kile || Rueter (2–2) || — || 12,470 || 23–12
|- bgcolor="ccffcc"
| 36 || May 10 || Astros || 5–2 || Fassero (3–3) || Dougherty || Rojas (4) || 30,315 || 24–12
|- bgcolor="ccffcc"
| 37 || May 11 || Astros || 10–9 (13) || Dyer (3–0) || Dougherty || — || 26,084 || 25–12
|- bgcolor="ccffcc"
| 38 || May 12 || Astros || 7–6 || Urbina (1–0) || Hampton || Rojas (5) || 19,345 || 26–12
|- bgcolor="ccffcc"
| 39 || May 13 || @ Dodgers || 3–2 || Manuel (2–0) || Worrell || Rojas (6) || 25,600 || 27–12
|- bgcolor="ffbbbb"
| 40 || May 14 || @ Dodgers || 1–2 || Martinez || Veres (4–1) || Worrell || 37,942 || 27–13
|- bgcolor="ffbbbb"
| 41 || May 15 || @ Dodgers || 2–7 || Candiotti || Fassero (3–4) || — || 26,875 || 27–14
|- bgcolor="ffbbbb"
| 42 || May 17 || @ Padres || 1–2 (12) || Hoffman || Rojas (3–2) || — || 26,469 || 27–15
|- bgcolor="ccffcc"
| 43 || May 18 || @ Padres || 3–2 || Urbina (2–0) || Valenzuela || Rojas (7) || 31,749 || 28–15
|- bgcolor="ffbbbb"
| 44 || May 19 || @ Padres || 3–4 || Worrell || Veres (4–2) || Hoffman || 28,769 || 28–16
|- bgcolor="ffbbbb"
| 45 || May 20 || @ Giants || 6–9 || Dewey || Dyer (3–1) || Beck || 10,062 || 28–17
|- bgcolor="ffbbbb"
| 46 || May 21 || @ Giants || 5–8 || Dewey || Aucoin (0–1) || Beck || 8,911 || 28–18
|- bgcolor="ccffcc"
| 47 || May 22 || @ Giants || 4–3 || Martinez (5–1) || VanLandingham || Rojas (8) || 11,663 || 29–18
|- bgcolor="ffbbbb"
| 48 || May 24 || Dodgers || 4–5 (11) || Osuna || Daal (0–2) || Worrell || 27,843 || 29–19
|- bgcolor="ffbbbb"
| 49 || May 25 || Dodgers || 3–5 || Martinez || Cormier (2–3) || Worrell || 27,104 || 29–20
|- bgcolor="ffbbbb"
| 50 || May 26 || Dodgers || 3–4 || Candiotti || Rojas (3–3) || Worrell || 30,718 || 29–21
|- bgcolor="ffbbbb"
| 51 || May 27 || Padres || 3–4 || Hamilton || Fassero (3–5) || Hoffman || 44,636 || 29–22
|- bgcolor="ffbbbb"
| 52 || May 28 || Padres || 2–3 (10) || Hoffman || Scott (1–1) || Bochtler || 16,537 || 29–23
|- bgcolor="ccffcc"
| 53 || May 29 || Padres || 9–4 || Urbina (3–0) || Valenzuela || — || 14,386 || 30–23
|- bgcolor="ccffcc"
| 54 || May 31 || Giants || 7–4 || Daal (1–2) || DeLucia || Veres (2) || 25,712 || 31–23
|-

|- bgcolor="ccffcc"
| 55 || June 1 || Giants || 5–1 || Fassero (4–5) || Fernandez || Dyer (1) || 36,858 || 32–23
|- bgcolor="ffbbbb"
| 56 || June 2 || Giants || 1–8 || Leiter || Martinez (5–2) || — || 25,006 || 32–24
|- bgcolor="ffbbbb"
| 57 || June 4 || @ Marlins || 0–5 || Burkett || Rueter (2–3) || — || 14,821 || 32–25
|- bgcolor="ccffcc"
| 58 || June 5 || @ Marlins || 2–1 || Cormier (3–3) || Rapp || Veres (3) || 21,342 || 33–25
|- bgcolor="ccffcc"
| 59 || June 7 || @ Cubs || 9–3 || Fassero (5–5) || Castillo || — || 23,860 || 34–25
|- bgcolor="ffbbbb"
| 60 || June 8 || @ Cubs || 4–6 || Telemaco || Martinez (5–3) || Wendell || 37,373 || 34–26
|- bgcolor="ffbbbb"
| 61 || June 9 || @ Cubs || 2–4 || Trachsel || Rueter (2–4) || Wendell || 30,785 || 34–27
|- bgcolor="ffbbbb"
| 62 || June 10 || Marlins || 2–5 || Nen || Dyer (3–2) || — || 34,867 || 34–28
|- bgcolor="ccffcc"
| 63 || June 11 || Marlins || 3–2 || Scott (2–1) || Brown || Veres (4) || 10,758 || 35–28
|- bgcolor="ccffcc"
| 64 || June 12 || Marlins || 8–0 || Fassero (6–5) || Leiter || — || 12,341 || 36–28
|- bgcolor="ccffcc"
| 65 || June 14 || @ Reds || 6–1 || Martinez (6–3) || Portugal || — || 26,691 || 37–28
|- bgcolor="ccffcc"
| 66 || June 15 || @ Reds || 6–5 || Rueter (3–4) || Burba || Rojas (9) || 32,833 || 38–28
|- bgcolor="ffbbbb"
| 67 || June 16 || @ Reds || 0–7 || Salkeld || Cormier (3–4) || — || 25,657 || 38–29
|- bgcolor="ccffcc"
| 68 || June 17 || @ Rockies || 5–3 || Urbina (4–0) || Freeman || Rojas (10) || 48,021 || 39–29
|- bgcolor="ccffcc"
| 69 || June 18 || @ Rockies || 12–8 || Dyer (4–2) || Holmes || — || 50,025 || 40–29
|- bgcolor="ffbbbb"
| 70 || June 19 || @ Rockies || 6–7 (10) || Ruffin || Scott (2–2) || — || 48,007 || 40–30
|- bgcolor="ccffcc"
| 71 || June 20 || Cardinals || 8–3 || Rueter (4–4) || Stottlemyre || — || 15,095 || 41–30
|- bgcolor="ccffcc"
| 72 || June 21 || Cardinals || 4–3 (12) || Rojas (4–3) || Eckersley || — || 16,136 || 42–30
|- bgcolor="ffbbbb"
| 73 || June 22 || Cardinals || 4–9 || Morgan || Urbina (4–1) || — || 16,895 || 42–31
|- bgcolor="ccffcc"
| 74 || June 23 || Cardinals || 3–2 || Fassero (7–5) || Osborne || Rojas (11) || 22,168 || 43–31
|- bgcolor="ccffcc"
| 75 || June 24 || Pirates || 11–3 || Martinez (7–3) || Dessens || — || 23,736 || 44–31
|- bgcolor="ccffcc"
| 76 || June 25 || Pirates || 8–2 || Rueter (5–4) || Smith || Scott (1) || 12,776 || 45–31
|- bgcolor="ffbbbb"
| 77 || June 26 || Pirates || 1–3 || Darwin || Cormier (3–5) || Cordova || 12,846 || 45–32
|- bgcolor="ffbbbb"
| 78 || June 28 || @ Phillies || 3–7 || Mulholland || Urbina (4–2) || Ryan || 21,703 || 45–33
|- bgcolor="ccffcc"
| 79 || June 29 || @ Phillies || 1–0 || Fassero (8–5) || Schilling || — || 22,898 || 46–33
|- bgcolor="ccffcc"
| 80 || June 30 || @ Phillies || 6–5 || Rojas (5–3) || Bottalico || Dyer (2) || 24,949 || 47–33
|-

|- bgcolor="ffbbbb"
| 81 || July 1 || Braves || 2–7 || Avery || Rueter (5–5) || — || 34,116 || 47–34
|- bgcolor="ccffcc"
| 82 || July 2 || Braves || 5–1 || Cormier (4–5) || Maddux || — || 20,075 || 48–34
|- bgcolor="ffbbbb"
| 83 || July 3 || Braves || 1–3 || Glavine || Scott (2–3) || Wohlers || 26,837 || 48–35
|- bgcolor="ffbbbb"
| 84 || July 4 || Mets || 0–4 || Person || Fassero (8–6) || — || 11,861 || 48–36
|- bgcolor="ffbbbb"
| 85 || July 5 || Mets || 6–9 || Dipoto || Scott (2–4) || Franco || 13,550 || 48–37
|- bgcolor="ffbbbb"
| 86 || July 6 || Mets || 3–11 || Jones || Rueter (5–6) || — || 15,546 || 48–38
|- bgcolor="ccffcc"
| 87 || July 7 || Mets || 4–3 || Cormier (5–5) || Harnisch || Rojas (12) || 16,076 || 49–38
|- bgcolor="ffbbbb"
| 88 || July 11 || Phillies || 2–3 || Schilling || Fassero (8–7) || Bottalico || 17,546 || 49–39
|- bgcolor="ffbbbb"
| 89 || July 12 || Phillies || 3–5 || Mulholland || Martinez (7–4) || — || 14,322 || 49–40
|- bgcolor="ffbbbb"
| 90 || July 13 || Phillies || 2–6 || Mimbs || Cormier (5–6) || — || 30,215 || 49–41
|- bgcolor="ccffcc"
| 91 || July 14 || Phillies || 5–2 || Scott (3–4) || Williams || Rojas (13) || 31,515 || 50–41
|- bgcolor="ffbbbb"
| 92 || July 15 || @ Braves || 4–5 || Maddux || Manuel (2–1) || Wohlers || 32,708 || 50–42
|- bgcolor="ffbbbb"
| 93 || July 16 || @ Braves || 2–3 || Wohlers || Scott (3–5) || — || 31,334 || 50–43
|- bgcolor="ccffcc"
| 94 || July 18 || @ Mets || 7–3 || Martinez (8–4) || Harnisch || — || 19,467 || 51–43
|- bgcolor="ccffcc"
| 95 || July 19 || @ Mets || 5–4 || Dyer (5–2) || Isringhausen || Rojas (14) || 19,005 || 52–43
|- bgcolor="ffbbbb"
| 96 || July 20 || @ Mets || 1–4 || Wilson || Urbina (4–3) || Franco || 27,407 || 52–44
|- bgcolor="ccffcc"
| 97 || July 21 || @ Mets || 4–3 || Fassero (9–7) || Clark || Rojas (15) || 32,173 || 53–44
|- bgcolor="ffbbbb"
| 98 || July 23 || @ Pirates || 1–5 || Lieber || Martinez (8–5) || — || 10,292 || 53–45
|- bgcolor="ffbbbb"
| 99 || July 24 || @ Pirates || 4–5 || Ericks || Rojas (5–4) || — || 19,219 || 53–46
|- bgcolor="ccffcc"
| 100 || July 25 || @ Cardinals || 4–2 || Urbina (5–3) || Petkovsek || Rojas (16) || 34,271 || 54–46
|- bgcolor="ccffcc"
| 101 || July 26 || @ Cardinals || 5–1 || Fassero (10–7) || Osborne || — || 30,048 || 55–46
|- bgcolor="ffbbbb"
| 102 || July 27 || @ Cardinals || 3–6 || Benes || Dyer (5–3) || Eckersley || 44,269 || 55–47
|- bgcolor="ffbbbb"
| 103 || July 28 || @ Cardinals || 4–6 || Petkovsek || Martinez (8–6) || Mathews || 31,226 || 55–48
|- bgcolor="ccffcc"
| 104 || July 29 || Rockies || 4–1 || Cormier (6–6) || Wright || Rojas (17) || 19,115 || 56–48
|- bgcolor="ccffcc"
| 105 || July 30 || Rockies || 3–1 || Urbina (6–3) || Reynoso || Rojas (18) || 17,071 || 57–48
|- bgcolor="ccffcc"
| 106 || July 31 || Rockies || 6–2 || Fassero (11–7) || Bailey || — || 23,663 || 58–48
|-

|- bgcolor="ffbbbb"
| 107 || August 1 || Reds || 7–9 || Shaw || Dyer (5–4) || Brantley || 13,725 || 58–49
|- bgcolor="ccffcc"
| 108 || August 2 || Reds || 11–1 || Martinez (9–6) || Jarvis || — || 12,988 || 59–49
|- bgcolor="ccffcc"
| 109 || August 3 || Reds || 6–2 || Cormier (7–6) || Portugal || Rojas (19) || 17,184 || 60–49
|- bgcolor="ccffcc"
| 110 || August 4 || Reds || 7–3 || Urbina (7–3) || Burba || Rojas (20) || 15,408 || 61–49
|- bgcolor="ccffcc"
| 111 || August 6 || @ Astros || 7–5 || Fassero (12–7) || Kile || Rojas (21) || 17,658 || 62–49
|- bgcolor="ccffcc"
| 112 || August 7 || @ Astros || 13–5 || Leiter (1–0) || Wall || — || 19,703 || 63–49
|- bgcolor="ffbbbb"
| 113 || August 8 || @ Astros || 2–6 || Drabek || Martinez (9–7) || — || 26,632 || 63–50
|- bgcolor="ffbbbb"
| 114 || August 9 || Cubs || 9–11 || Bullinger || Cormier (7–7) || Patterson || 15,498 || 63–51
|- bgcolor="ffbbbb"
| 115 || August 10 || Cubs || 2–3 || Casian || Dyer (5–5) || Wendell || 16,724 || 63–52
|- bgcolor="ccffcc"
| 116 || August 11 || Cubs || 4–3 (10) || Rojas (6–4) || Bottenfield || — || 20,120 || 64–52
|- bgcolor="ccffcc"
| 117 || August 12 || Astros || 8–1 || Leiter (2–0) || Darwin || — || 35,458 || 65–52
|- bgcolor="ccffcc"
| 118 || August 13 || Astros || 7–4 || Martinez (10–7) || Drabek || Rojas (22) || 17,103 || 66–52
|- bgcolor="ffbbbb"
| 119 || August 14 || Astros || 3–8 || Reynolds || Cormier (7–8) || — || 19,136 || 66–53
|- bgcolor="ffbbbb"
| 120 || August 16 || @ Dodgers || 2–8 || Astacio || Urbina (7–4) || — || 51,573 || 66–54
|- bgcolor="ffbbbb"
| 121 || August 17 || @ Dodgers || 6–7 || Worrell || Veres (4–3) || — || 47,549 || 66–55
|- bgcolor="ccffcc"
| 122 || August 18 || @ Dodgers || 7–3 || Leiter (3–0) || Candiotti || — || 36,673 || 67–55
|- bgcolor="ffbbbb"
| 123 || August 19 || @ Padres || 3–7 || Sanders || Martinez (10–8) || Hoffman || 33,490 || 67–56
|- bgcolor="ffbbbb"
| 124 || August 20 || @ Padres || 0–3 || Tewksbury || Cormier (7–9) || Hoffman || 18,426 || 67–57
|- bgcolor="ffbbbb"
| 125 || August 21 || @ Padres || 2–7 || Valenzuela || Urbina (7–5) || — || 29,182 || 67–58
|- bgcolor="ccffcc"
| 126 || August 22 || @ Giants || 5–4 || Fassero (13–7) || Bautista || Rojas (23) || 14,744 || 68–58
|- bgcolor="ccffcc"
| 127 || August 23 || @ Giants || 10–8 || Daal (2–2) || Creek || Rojas (24) || 18,739 || 69–58
|- bgcolor="ccffcc"
| 128 || August 24 || @ Giants || 3–0 || Martinez (11–8) || Estes || Rojas (25) || 22,710 || 70–58
|- bgcolor="ffbbbb"
| 129 || August 25 || @ Giants || 2–7 || Fernandez || Cormier (7–10) || — || 24,349 || 70–59
|- bgcolor="ffbbbb"
| 130 || August 27 || Dodgers || 1–5 || Nomo || Fassero (13–8) || — || 21,040 || 70–60
|- bgcolor="ccffcc"
| 131 || August 28 || Dodgers || 6–5 || Rojas (7–4) || Park || — || 13,006 || 71–60
|- bgcolor="ffbbbb"
| 132 || August 29 || Dodgers || 1–2 || Martinez || Martinez (11–9) || Worrell || 16,551 || 71–61
|- bgcolor="ffbbbb"
| 133 || August 30 || Padres || 0–6 || Sanders || Paniagua (1–2) || — || 14,133 || 71–62
|- bgcolor="ccffcc"
| 134 || August 31 || Padres || 4–2 || Daal (3–2) || Tewksbury || Rojas (26) || 18,235 || 72–62
|-

|- bgcolor="ccffcc"
| 135 || September 1 || Padres || 7–6 || Fassero (14–8) || Ashby || Rojas (27) || 20,666 || 73–62
|- bgcolor="ccffcc"
| 136 || September 2 || Giants || 4–3 (11) || Manuel (3–1) || Beck || — || 26,689 || 74–62
|- bgcolor="ccffcc"
| 137 || September 3 || Giants || 9–2 || Martinez (12–9) || Gardner || — || 20,168 || 75–62
|- bgcolor="ccffcc"
| 138 || September 4 || Giants || 6–0 || Paniagua (2–2) || Estes || — || 20,317 || 76–62
|- bgcolor="ccffcc"
| 139 || September 5 || @ Marlins || 6–2 || Manuel (4–1) || Rapp || — || 16,080 || 77–62
|- bgcolor="ffbbbb"
| 140 || September 6 || @ Marlins || 0–4 || Hutton || Fassero (14–9) || Powell || 16,943 || 77–63
|- bgcolor="ccffcc"
| 141 || September 7 || @ Marlins || 2–1 || Leiter (4–0) || Valdes || Rojas (28) || 25,278 || 78–63
|- bgcolor="ffbbbb"
| 142 || September 8 || @ Marlins || 1–2 || Helling || Martinez (12–10) || Nen || 19,427 || 78–64
|- bgcolor="ffbbbb"
| 143 || September 9 || @ Cubs || 1–3 || Foster || Paniagua (2–3) || — || 24,452 || 78–65
|- bgcolor="ffbbbb"
| 144 || September 10 || @ Cubs || 3–10 || Bottenfield || Daal (3–3) || — || 26,700 || 78–66
|- bgcolor="ccffcc"
| 145 || September 11 || @ Cubs || 2–1 || Urbina (8–5) || Adams || Rojas (29) || 30,729 || 79–66
|- bgcolor="ccffcc"
| 146 || September 12 || Marlins || 5–4 || Veres (5–3) || Powell || Rojas (30) || 9,308 || 80–66
|- bgcolor="ccffcc"
| 147 || September 13 || Marlins || 3–2 || Martinez (13–10) || Helling || Rojas (31) || 13,723 || 81–66
|- bgcolor="ccffcc"
| 148 || September 14 || Marlins || 3–2 || Veres (6–3) || Powell || Rojas (32) || 17,546 || 82–66
|- bgcolor="ffbbbb"
| 149 || September 15 || Marlins || 3–4 || Leiter || Daal (3–4) || Nen || 26,166 || 82–67
|- bgcolor="ccffcc"
| 150 || September 17 || Mets || 7–1 || Fassero (15–9) || Isringhausen || — || 17,282 || 83–67
|- bgcolor="ccffcc"
| 151 || September 18 || Mets || 4–3 || Urbina (9–5) || Mlicki || Rojas (33) || 14,930 || 84–67
|- bgcolor="ccffcc"
| 152 || September 19 || @ Braves || 5–1 || Urbina (10–5) || Wohlers || — || 37,193 || 85–67
|- bgcolor="ffbbbb"
| 153 || September 20 || @ Braves || 2–3 || Glavine || Leiper (0–1) || Wohlers || 46,260 || 85–68
|- bgcolor="ffbbbb"
| 154 || September 21 || @ Braves || 4–5 || Neagle || Daal (3–5) || Wohlers || 49,285 || 85–69
|- bgcolor="ffbbbb"
| 155 || September 22 || @ Braves || 2–8 || Smoltz || Fassero (15–10) || — || 49,238 || 85–70
|- bgcolor="ffbbbb"
| 156 || September 23 || @ Braves || 1–3 || Maddux || Leiter (4–1) || Bielecki || 49,083 || 85–71
|- bgcolor="ccffcc"
| 157 || September 24 || @ Phillies || 6–2 || Juden (1–0) || Williams || Rojas (34) || 16,044 || 86–71
|- bgcolor="ffbbbb"
| 158 || September 25 || @ Phillies || 1–3 || West || Paniagua (2–4) || Bottalico || 17,544 || 86–72
|- bgcolor="ccffcc"
| 159 || September 26 || @ Phillies || 5–2 || Daal (4–5) || Schilling || Rojas (35) || 16,587 || 87–72
|- bgcolor="ffbbbb"
| 160 || September 27 || Braves || 4–6 || Smoltz || Fassero (15–11) || Wohlers || 33,133 || 87–73
|- bgcolor="ffbbbb"
| 161 || September 28 || Braves || 0–4 || Woodall || Leiter (4–2) || — || 34,125 || 87–74
|- bgcolor="ccffcc"
| 162 || September 29 || Braves || 6–3 || Alvarez (2–1) || Avery || Rojas (36) || 30,646 || 88–74
|-

|-
| Legend:       = Win       = LossBold = Expos team member

Detailed records

Transactions
June 4, 1996: Milton Bradley was drafted by the Montreal Expos in the 2nd round of the 1996 amateur draft. Player signed July 1, 1996.
June 12, 1996: Wally Whitehurst was selected off waivers by the New York Yankees from the Montreal Expos. 
June 25, 1996: Jon Habyan was signed as a free agent with the Montreal Expos. 
July 11, 1996: Jeff Juden was selected off waivers by the Montreal Expos from the San Francisco Giants.
July 30, 1996: Kirk Rueter was traded by the Montreal Expos with Tim Scott to the San Francisco Giants for Mark Leiter.

Roster

Player stats

Batting

Starters by position
Note: G = Games played; AB = At bats; R = Runs; H = Hits; HR = Home runs; RBI = Runs batted in; Avg. = Batting average; SB = Stolen bases

Other batters
Note: G = Games played; AB = At bats; R = Runs; H = Hits; HR = Home runs; RBI = Runs batted in; Avg. = Batting average; SB = Stolen bases

Pitching

Starting pitchers
Note: G = Games pitched; IP = Innings pitched; W = Wins; L = Losses; ERA = Earned run average; SO = Strikeouts; BB = Walks allowed

Other pitchers
Note: G = Games pitched; IP = Innings pitched; W = Wins; L = Losses; ERA = Earned run average; SO = Strikeouts; BB = Walks allowed

Relief pitchers
Note: G = Games pitched; IP = Innings pitched; W = Wins; L = Losses; SV = Saves; ERA = Earned run average; SO = Strikeouts; BB = Walks allowed

Award winners
 Jeff Fassero, National League Pitcher of the Month, June 
 Jeff Fassero, National League Pitcher of the Month, July

1996 Major League Baseball All-Star Game

Farm system

LEAGUE CHAMPIONS: Harrisburg, Vermont

References

External links
 1996 Montreal Expos team at Baseball-Reference
 1996 Montreal Expos team page at www.baseball-almanac.com

Montreal Expos seasons
Montreal Expos
1990s in Montreal
1996 in Quebec